Breitlauenen is a railway station on the Schynige Platte railway, a rack railway that connects Wilderswil with the Schynige Platte in the Bernese Oberland region of Switzerland. Breitlauenen is the only intermediate station on the line, and has one of the line's two passing loops.

Administratively, the station is in the municipality of Gsteigwiler in the canton of Bern.

The station is served by the following passenger trains:

References

External links 
 

Railway stations in the canton of Bern
Bernese Oberland Railway stations